Antti Koskinen (21 April 1929 – 31 August 1988) was a Finnish sports shooter. He competed in the 50 metre rifle, prone event at the 1964 Summer Olympics.

References

1929 births
1988 deaths
Finnish male sport shooters
Olympic shooters of Finland
Shooters at the 1964 Summer Olympics
Sportspeople from Helsinki